Test Shot Starfish is an American electronic music production duo formed in 1999 by Kyle Schember and Ryan Stuit.

History 
The duo met on the film set for Forever Fabulous in Los Angeles in the late 90s. Their first EP was released in 2003 and a self titled full length album in 2005. Their name refers to the Starfish Prime nuclear test from 1962, the largest nuclear detonation in space.

Music Style 
Test Shot Starfish "is the sound of space, if it had one – at least in this parsec". For example, their song "LC-39A" is inspired by the launch pad of the same name which launched Apollo, Space Shuttle, and Falcon Heavy.  Another example is on "Sputnik" which was named after the first artificial satellite. The song contained samples of news clips and the audio from the satellite itself. Their music is also commonly used in SpaceX's YouTube livestreams of rocket launches.

Discography 
Studio Albums

 Test Shot Starfish (2005)
 Music For Space (2018)
 Music For Space Sleep (2020)
 Earth Analog (2022)

Extended Plays

 Test Shot Starfish EP (2003)
Singles

 Mars (2019)
 Cities in Flight (2019)
 The New Astronauts (2020)
 Crew (2020)
 Moon (feat. Everyday Astronaut) (2021)

References

External links 
 Test Shot Starfish official site
 Test Shot Starfish discography on MusicBrainz
 Test Shot Starfish SoundCloud

Electronic music duos
Musical groups established in 1999
Musical groups from Los Angeles
1999 establishments in California